First Unitarian Universalist Church of Niagara is a historic church located at Niagara Falls in Niagara County, New York.  It was constructed in 1921 in a Classical Revival style.  The steel and concrete church is faced with rough, uncut limestone from the bedrock excavated for the building's foundation.

It was listed on the National Register of Historic Places in 2007.

References

External links
Preservation Studios Buffalo, NY: historic building rehabilitation and preservation consultants
First UU Church of Niagara website 
 Historical legal documents regarding the church property are in the Andover-Harvard Theological Library at Harvard Divinity School in Cambridge, Massachusetts.

Niagara FirstUnitarian
Niagara FirstUnitarian
Niagara FirstUnitarian
Churches in Niagara Falls, New York
Niagara FirstUnitarian
Niagara FirstUnitarian
National Register of Historic Places in Niagara County, New York
Neoclassical church buildings in the United States